The Voice Australia is an Australian reality talent show based on the original Dutch version of the program created by John de Mol and is part of a wider international franchise. The winner receives a Universal Music Australia recording contract. Karise Eden was the winner of the first season. Her debut single, "You Won't Let Me", peaked at number five on the Australian ARIA Singles Chart, and her debut album My Journey reached number one on the ARIA Albums Chart. Eden's second single, "Threads of Silence", peaked at number 19. The winner of the second season was Harrison Craig. His debut single, "Unconditional", charted at number 15 in Australia. Craig's debut album More Than a Dream reached number one in both Australia and New Zealand and received a platinum certification in Australia.

Some contestants who did not win The Voice were given record deals and have also achieved success in the Australia, while other contestants have released non-charting albums and singles independently. The contestants' record their weekly performances which are released to the iTunes Store after the show and can sometimes lead to a large number of downloads.

The show ran on Nine Network from 2012 to 2020 and premiered on Seven Network in 2021. Coaches throughout the run of the series have included Delta Goodrem, Seal, Joel Madden, Keith Urban, Ricky Martin, Kylie Minogue, will.i.am, Benji Madden, Jessie J, Ronan Keating, Boy George, Kelly Rowland, Joe Jonas, Guy Sebastian, Rita Ora, Jessica Mauboy, and Jason Derulo.

Albums

Studio albums

Singles

Certifications

Australia
The current Australian Recording Industry Association (ARIA) certification levels for albums and singles:
Gold: 35,000 units
Platinum: 70,000 units

New Zealand
The current Recorded Music NZ (RMNZ) certification levels for albums and singles:
Gold: 7,500 units
Platinum: 15,000 units

References

Discography
Lists of mass media in Australia
Lists of songs by reality television contestants